René Leprince (1876 – 25 May 1929) was an early French silent film director best known for his silent films of the 1910s and 1920s.

In film, Leprince began as an actor in 1908 and dabbled with directing. In 1911 he moved into directing permanently and directed some 70 films between 1908 and 1929.

Selected filmography
 La folie du doute (1920)
 Face à l'Océan (1920)
 My Uncle Benjamin (1924)
 Fanfan la Tulipe (1925)
 Princess Masha (1927)
 Temptation (1929)

External links 

1876 births
1929 deaths
French film directors
Silent film directors
French male silent film actors
20th-century French male actors
Articles containing video clips